This is a list of saints of Scotland, which includes saints from Scotland, associated with, or particularly venerated in Scotland.

Veneration of saints in Scotland
One of the main features of Medieval Scotland was the Veneration of Saints. Saints of Irish origin who were particularly revered included various figures called St Faelan and St. Colman, and saints Findbar and Finan. Columba remained a major figure into the fourteenth century and a new foundation at the site of his bones was endowed by William I (r. 1165–1214) at Arbroath Abbey. In Strathclyde the most important saint was St Kentigern, whose cult (under the pet name St. Mungo) became focused in Glasgow. In Lothian it was St Cuthbert, whose relics were carried across Northumbria after Lindisfarne was sacked by the Vikings before being installed in Durham Cathedral. After his martyrdom around 1115, a cult emerged in Orkney, Shetland and northern Scotland around Magnus Erlendsson, Earl of Orkney.

Veneration of Saint Andrew
St Andrew is the patron saint of Scotland and has a long history of veneration there. The cult of St Andrew was established on the east coast at Kilrymont by the Pictish kings as early as the eighth century. The shrine, which from the twelfth century was said to have contained the relics of the saint brought to Scotland by Saint Regulus.

Developments in the Late Middle Ages
By the twelfth century it had become known simply as St. Andrews and it became increasingly associated with Scottish national identity and the royal family. Queen Margaret was canonised in 1250 and after the ceremonial transfer of her remains to Dunfermline Abbey emerged as one of the most revered national saints. In the late medieval period, as the doctrine of Purgatory gained in importance in the period, the number of chapelries, priests and masses for the dead within them grew rapidly, along with the number of altars to saints, with St. Mary's in Dundee having perhaps 48 and St Giles' in Edinburgh over 50, as did the number of saints celebrated in Scotland, with about 90 being added to the missal used in St Nicholas church in Aberdeen.

Impact of the Reformation
The Reformation made the veneration of saints illegal and removed almost all evidence of saints and shrines from churches, although Catholicism continued as a minority religion. The period created only one Catholic saint, the convert and martyr John Ogilvie (1569–1615).

List of saints

A
 Adomnán
 Adrian of May
 Almus
 Andrew the Apostle

B
 Barvitus
 Blane
 Saint Findbarr of Barra
C
 Cainnech of Aghaboe
 Cathan
 Cathróe (bishop of the Scots)
 Colman
 Columba
 Conran of Orkney
 Constantine of Strathclyde
 Conval
 Curetán
 Cuthbert

D
 David I of Scotland
 Donald of Ogilvy
 Donnán of Eigg
 Dotto
 Drostan
 Duthac

E
 Magnus
 Ernan

F
 Fergus
 Finan of Lindisfarne
 Fillan of Pittenweem
 Fillan
 Finbarr of Cork

G
 Gervadius
 Gilbert de Moravia

H
 Himelin

I
 Inan

K
 Kessog
 Ronald of Orkney

L
 Ludan

M
 Machan
 Machar
 Máel Ruba 
 Margaret of Scotland
 Marnock
 Medan
 Mirin
 Modan
 Molaise of Leighlin
 Moluag
 Monan
 Mungo
 Munn

N
 Nathalan
 Ninian

O
 Oda
 Odran of Iona
 John Ogilvie

P
 Psalmodius

R
 Regulus
 Rufus

S
 Serf

T
 Teneu
 Ternan
 Triduana

W
 Wendelin of Trier
 William of Perth

See also
 Catholic Church in Scotland

References